Kylemore Lough is a freshwater lake in the west of Ireland. It is located in the Connemara area of County Galway.

Geography
Kylemore Abbey, a major area attraction, is located on the shore of neighbouring Pollacapall Lough.

Natural history
Fish species in Kylemore Lough include salmon and brown trout. Kylemore Lough is part of The Twelve Bens/Garraun Complex Special Area of Conservation.

See also
List of loughs in Ireland

References

Kylemore